Onecote is a civil parish in the district of Staffordshire Moorlands, Staffordshire, England. It contains twelve listed buildings that are recorded in the National Heritage List for England. All the listed buildings are designated at Grade II, the lowest of the three grades, which is applied to "buildings of national importance and special interest".  The parish contains the village of Onecote, and is otherwise rural.  Most of the listed buildings are farmhouses and farm buildings, and the other listed buildings include a church and a memorial in the churchyard, a bridge, a public house, and a milepost.


Buildings

References

Citations

Sources

Lists of listed buildings in Staffordshire